Sarsawa Air Force Station is located approximately  from Saharanpur City, Uttar Pradesh, India and is approximately  from Yamunanagar, Haryana, India. It belongs to the Western Air Command. Though the sole user of this airbase is the Indian Air Force, it does handle civilian flights on a regular basis for VIP transport to Yamunanagar  and Saharanpur

The Air force station is also headquarters for the Special Group.

References

S